Lists of spacewalks and moonwalks include:

By date:
 List of spacewalks and moonwalks 1965–1999
 List of spacewalks 2000–2014
 List of spacewalks since 2015

By space station:
 List of Salyut spacewalks
 List of Mir spacewalks
 List of International Space Station spacewalks

Other:
 List of cumulative spacewalk records

See also
 Extra-vehicular activity